Bust a Nut is the fourth studio album by American hard rock band Tesla, released in 1994. It was their final studio album on Geffen Records. The first single was "Mama's Fool," followed by "Need Your Loving" and "A Lot To Lose." The album was certified gold by RIAA on March 16, 1995.

Critical reception

In November 2011, Bust a Nut was ranked number ten (preceded by R.E.M.'s Monster) on Guitar World magazine's top ten list of guitar albums of 1994.

Track listing

Personnel
Jeff Keith: Lead Vocals
Frank Hannon: Acoustic & Electric Guitars, Keyboards, Backing Vocals
Tommy Skeoch: Acoustic & Electric Guitars, Backing Vocals
Brian Wheat: Bass, Backing Vocals
Troy Luccketta: Drums, Percussion

Production
Produced By Terry Thomas
Engineered By Rafe McKenna & Andrew Scarth
Assistant Engineer: Richard Duarte
Mixing: Rafe McKenna & Terry Thomas
Mastering: George Marino

Charts

Weekly charts

Singles

Certifications

References

1994 albums
Tesla (band) albums
Geffen Records albums